Jet black or jet-black is a shade of black referring to the geological material jet.

Jet black may refer to:
 Jet black, the darkest shade of black hair color
 Jet Black, English drummer for The Stranglers
 "Jet Black", the second single released by The Shadows (known then as The Drifters); released in 1959.
 "Jet Black", a 1995 song by Jawbreaker from Dear You
 Jet Black (album), an album by Gentleman Reg.
 Jet Black (Cowboy Bebop), a character from the anime Cowboy Bebop
 Jet Black (Viewtiful Joe), a character from the video game series Viewtiful Joe

See also